Moshe Szyf is a geneticist and James McGill professor of pharmacology and therapeutics at the McGill University, where he also holds a GlaxoSmithKline-CIHR chair in pharmacology.

Szyf's main research interests lie with epigenetics, including behavioral epigenetics as well as cancer research.

Education and career 
Szyf received his Ph.D. from the Hebrew University on basic mechanisms of DNA methylation under the supervision of Aharon Razin. Subsequently, he performed postdoctoral work at Harvard Medical School. In 1989, he was appointed as assistant professor in the department of Pharmacology and Therapeutics at McGill University, Canada.
In 2016, Moshe Szyf founded Montreal EpiTerapia Inc. in Canada and HKG Epitherapeutics in Hong Kong in order to develop novel tools for the early detection of cancer and promoting healthy aging.

Publications 
Books
 Moshe Szyf, DNA Methylation and Cancer Therapy, Springer, 2005, 
 Moshe Szyf, Fundamentals of Epigenetics, Cambridge University Press, 

Articles
, Moshe Szyf published 295 papers in peer-reviewed journals, almost all on epigenetics with a focus on.cancer until the early 2000s and mostly environmental factors thereafter. He is a member of the editorial board of the journal Environmental Epigenetics, published by Oxford University Press.

Szyf also holds many patents, all relating to epigenetics-based therapeutics.

References

External links 
 Mosze Szyf, 18 April 2013
 Moshe Szyf, James McGill professor of Pharmacology and Therapeutics, McGill Reporter, 1 April 2009
 Dr. Moshe Szyf, sickkids.ca
 Professor Moshe Szyf, lifeboat foundation
 RSA/NSPCC Lecture

Living people
Year of birth missing (living people)
American geneticists
Academic staff of McGill University